Lake Pidborivske is a lake located in the north of urban-type settlement of Bezliudivka in Kharkiv Raion, Kharkiv Oblast of Ukraine. It is often visited by residents of Kharkiv for recreation. On the lake there is a water park "Alexandra", "White Beach" and "Pisochnytsia" beach.

The name comes from the Bezliudivka district, called "Pidborivka"

External links 
 Пруды Харьковщины
 Вивчення місцевих гідронімів шкільними краєзнавцями (на прикладі водойм смт Безлюдівка) / Кисиленко В. Ю. // Географія та економіка в рідній школі. — 2014. — № 4.

Geography of Kharkiv Oblast
Pidborivske